Eremographa is a monotypic snout moth genus described by Edward Meyrick in 1932. It contains the single species Eremographa sebasmia described by the same author in 1887. It is found in Australia.

References 

Phycitini
Monotypic moth genera
Moths described in 1887
Moths of Australia
Pyralidae genera